Universum is an Austrian popular science magazine published in German and based in Vienna, Austria. The magazine is the only Austrian publication in the field of popular science, because Germany-published magazines dominate the field in the country. The magazine is financially supported by the Austrian National Science Foundation.

History and profile
Universum was established in 1998 as a joint venture of Austrian Radio and Television and N.O Pressehaus. The latter owned and published the magazine. Then the magazine began to be owned and published by the LW Media. Universum is based in Vienna.

The magazine is published ten times a year. It covers science and nature stories about the determination of gender, cystic fibrosis, genetic determination of wine genealogy, analysis of viral genes and RNA analysis amongst other things. The subtitle of the magazine is "the most beautiful magazine of Austria", reflecting its preference for covering non-conflictual topics.

Oliver Lehman is the founding editor-in-chief. He served in the post until 2007 and resigned from the magazine in 2013. Martin Kugler is the current editor-in-chief of Universum.

Universum had a circulation of about 70,000 copies in 2002. In 2007 the magazine sold 52,000 copies. Its circulation was 42,000 copies in 2010.

See also
 List of magazines in Austria

References

External links

1998 establishments in Austria
German-language magazines
Magazines established in 1998
Magazines published in Vienna
Popular science magazines
Ten times annually magazines